De kroongetuige is a novel by Dutch author Maarten 't Hart. It was first published in 1983.

Novels by Maarten 't Hart
1983 novels